Stop, Look & Listen is a 1994 release, featuring Tommy Dorsey and His Orchestra's work prior to their collaborations with Frank Sinatra, featuring songs from the late 1930s through the early 1940s.

Track listing

Credits

Personnel
Alto sax: Clyde Rounds, Hymie Schertzer, Fred Stulce, Harry Schuchman, Sid Stonebum, Slats Long, Joe Dixon, Noni Bernardi, Mike Doty, Skeets Herfurt, Johnny Mince
Bass: Phil Stevens, Gene Traxler, Sid Weiss
Clarinet: Fred Stulce, Sid Stonebum, Joe Dixon, Mike Doty, Don Lodice, Johnny Mince, Bud Freeman
Drums: Moe Purtill, Dave Tough, Sam Rosen, Cliff Leeman, Buddy Rich
Guitar: Carmen Mastren, William Schaffer,  Clark Yocum, Mac Cheikes
Piano: Milt Raskin, Howard Smith, Joe Bushkin, Dick Jones, Paul Mitchell
Tenor Sax: Clyde Rounds, John Van Eps, Sid Block, Bob Bunch, Heine Beau, Skeets Herfurt, Don Lodice, Deane Kincaide, Bud Freeman
Trombone: Lowell Martin, David Jacob, Elmer Smithers, Ward Silloway, Cliff Weston, Walter Mercurio, Ben pickering, Earle H. Hagen, George Arus, Red Bone, Tommy Dorsey, Les Jenkins
Trumpet: Jimmy Welch, Jimmy Blake, Mickey Bloom, Sammy Shapiro, Jimmy Zito, Joe Bauer, Charlie Peterson, Pee Wee Erwin, Ziggy Elman, Lee Castle, Charlie Spivak, Yank Lawson, Max Kaminsky, Bunny Berigan, Steve Lipkins, Bill Graham, Bob Cusmano, Joe Bauer, Andy Ferrati, Sam Skolnick

References

1994 compilation albums
Tommy Dorsey albums